The United Nations Transitional Administration for Eastern Slavonia, Baranja and Western Sirmium (UNTAES) was a UN peacebuilding transitional administration in the Eastern Slavonia, Baranja and Western Syrmia in the eastern parts of Croatia (multicultural Danube river region). The transitional administration lasted between 1996 and 1998. It was also sometimes known as the United Nations Transitional Authority in Eastern Slavonia, Baranja and Western Sirmium. The transitional administration was formally established by the United Nations Security Council Resolution 1037 of January 15, 1996. The transitional administration was envisaged and invited in the November 1995 Erdut Agreement between the Croatian Government and the representatives of the local Serb community in the region. At the time of UNTAES deployment the region already hosted another traditional type UN peacekeeping mission known as the UNCRO. While the region was covered under the UNCRO's sector east (sector led by Russian and Belgian forces), the whole UNCRO mission was brought into question by the Operation Storm escalation of hostilities.

UNTAES is only the third UN peacekeeping mission in history (after UNTEA in Western New Guinea and UNTAC in Cambodia) where the UN assumed direct and high executive powers in the territory of concern. Via UNTAES, the United Nations temporarily took the role of governance in the region by creating an UN protectorate. At the end of the UNTAES deployment an additional monitoring support mission was provided for the region under the name of the United Nations Civilian Police Support Group.

History

Pre-establishment events
After the Operation Storm in mid-1995, the only remaining part of the self-proclaimed Republic of Serbian Krajina became that in eastern Croatia along the Danube river. Contrary to Krajina mainland, Eastern Slavonia, Baranja and Western Syrmia shared a long border with the Federal Republic of Yugoslavia (its constituent Republic of Serbia). It was also economically and socially dependent and politically much more closely aligned with authorities in Belgrade and Novi Sad than Krajina. This led the international community to believe that Croatian intervention in Eastern Slavonia case would trigger a military reaction from Yugoslavia and result in an escalation of hostilities. At the same time, the military defeat of Krajina and signing of the Washington Agreement opened the space to resolve the armed conflict in Bosnia which the US Administration wanted to use for political benefits before the 1996 United States presidential election.

In the context of successful Croatian military interventions of Bljesak and Oluja, initial idea that the region of Eastern Slavonia will be integrated back to Croatia through the peaceful means was perceived with astonishment on Croatian side and as a form of pressure from the international community. Croatian military establishment held informal talks about preparation of a military solution for the region under the code name "Skok u Dalj" ("Jump to Dalj"). There was lack of enthusiasm and belief that peaceful process will be successful among involved parties and other states in the region, themselves recently involved in Yugoslav Wars.

The Erdut Agreement between the Croatian Government and the representatives of the Serbs in the region was signed in November 1995, which requested that the UN form a transitional authority and a peacekeeping force. United Nations Security Council Resolution 1023 supported that, and after the UNCRO mission was terminated in the United Nations Security Council Resolution 1025, UNTAES was set up to serve as a United Nations protectorate over the region in Resolution 1037. Reintegration of the region, the last part of the country outside the control of central government and arguably geopolitically the most sensitive part of former self-proclaimed Republic of Serbian Krajina, was the most important Croatian condition for participation in Dayton Peace Negotiations. The subsequent Dayton agreement for peace in Bosnia ended the deadliest conflicts of the Yugoslav wars.

Transitional Administration

The transitional administration started its operations on January 15, 1996, with the United Nations Security Council Resolution 1043. It was meant to last for one year, with a provision for an extension of the mandate for up to one year at the request of either party. Administration's main task was to monitor demilitarization and ensure peaceful reintegration of the territory into Croatia. UN Secretary General initially proposed that UNTAES should have 9,300 soldiers. By the final agreement the administration had a military and a civilian component with 5,000 soldiers, 500 UNTAES civilian police (UNCIVPOL) and 99 military observers. At its full deployment UNTAES consisted of 4849 soldiers, 99 military observers and 401 civil police members, close to the agreed number.

Before the arrival of UNTAES troops in region there were already 1,600 troops from the Belgian and Russian Armed Forces under United Nations Confidence Restoration Operation in Croatia. They were joined by Jordanian and Pakistani mechanized battalions, Ukrainian helicopter gunships and other units. United States took a dominant role in implementation of reintegration process.

Strobe Talbott was one of the policy makers who raised the issue of regulation of position of Serbs in Croatia, the most important issue in Croatia–United States relations at the time, while US Ambassador Peter Galbraith organized three meetings with the population of the region in the towns of Vukovar, Beli Manastir and Ilok where he informed local Serbs that they will, regardless of fact that their leaders did not inform them on it, indeed became part of Croatia based on Erdut Agreement. He also told them that they have the right to stay, and live whenever they want in Croatia, be it Zagreb, Osijek, Donji Lapac, Knin or Glina and that ethnic Croats have the right to return to Eastern Slavonia. Madeleine Albright visited Vukovar in early 1996 to express her support to the process of reintegration where she was attacked with eggs and stones at local market. Initial headquarters was located at United Nations Protection Force headquarters in Zagreb but idea of mission personnel was to put headquarters in eastern Croatia. Croatian Government offered Osijek for that purpose but mission refused it since it wanted to locate it on the territory of Eastern Slavonia, Baranja and Western Syrmia. Therefore, the headquarters were located in Vukovar, with a liaison office in Beli Manastir, which provided UNTAES civil affairs officers with the opportunity to attend sessions of local Serb Executive Councils and assemblies which facilitated exchange of relevant information. One of the challenges mission faced was tense and peaceful retake of Đeletovci oil fields from the control of Scorpions paramilitary. Representatives of mission urged ambassadors from Zagreb to visit region and additionally introduced practice of visiting of the local Serbian orthodox churches and two Catholic churches that still were in operation.

On 13th of April 1997 UNTAES facilitated the conduct of Croatian Chamber of Counties election in region and on that occasion special US mission under Nancy Ely-Raphael leadership visited Vukovar. US special mission visited Sarvaš, Erdut, Dalj, Vukovar, Borovo, Lovas, Opatovac, Ilok, Šarengrad, Bilje, Čeminac, Beli Manastir and Kneževi Vinogradi. US mission gave its thanks to Croatian authorities for enabling Serb population with missing Croatian documents to vote and to local Serbian executive committee presided by Vojislav Stanimirović for motivating local Serb population to take part in Croatian elections. Mission once more underlined that the goal of Erdut Agreement to re-establish multi-ethnic region in Croatian Podunavlje.

Local police reform
One of the main tasks of UNTAES was reform of local police forces in which before the war occurred first inter-ethnic conflicts (see:Battle of Borovo Selo). UNTAES initial problem was to replacement of Federal Republic of Yugoslavia symbols. Since there was resistance to that, compromise was reached where UNTAES with financial support of US Department of Justice bought uniforms without any state features. Croatian government initially refused to begin paying salaries to local police but later agreed to do so since it showed return of Croatian sovereignty and responsibility for region. Second problem was the fact that Croatian government refused to pay salaries in Yugoslav dinar while local police didn't want it in Croatian kuna so in the end it was paid in Deutsche Mark. Management of transitional police forces was functioning on the basis of dualism where on each top position in the region there were two individuals, one from Croatian and one from Serbian community, including double commanders of police forces. Support for UNTAES was provided by Polish Special Police Group that made first arrest of an indicated war criminal who was former mayor of Vukovar.

Administration's extensions
 in July 1996 with the United Nations Security Council Resolution 1069
 in November 1996 with the United Nations Security Council Resolution 1079
 in July 1997 with the United Nations Security Council Resolution 1120

Subsequent events

The United Nations Security Council Resolution 1145 in late 1997 arranged for the United Nations Police Support Group (UNPSG) to take over UNTAES' policing tasks, effectively concluding the UNTAES mission on January 15, 1998. A support group of 180 civilian UN police officers remained to monitor the progress of the Croatian police and oversee the return of the refugees. As additional help to UNTAES mission, Organization for Security and Cooperation in Europe established OSCE Mission to Croatia whose tasks was to overlook of respect of human and minority rights, return of refugees, formation of public institutions and monitoring of work of civil police.

See also
List of territories governed by the United Nations
Joint Council of Municipalities
1997 Eastern Slavonia integrity referendum

References

External links
 Official UNTAES site

1998 disestablishments in Croatia
20th century in Croatia
History of Syrmia
History of Slavonia
History of Baranya (region)
1037
United Nations operations in the former Yugoslavia
Joint Council of Municipalities
1996 establishments in Croatia
Croatia and the United Nations
United States and the United Nations
Croatia–United States relations